In the United States, a presidential finding, more formally known as a Memorandum of Notification (MON), is a presidential directive required by statute to be delivered to certain Congressional committees to justify the commencement of covert operations by the Central Intelligence Agency (CIA).

History
Current use of the presidential finding stems from the so-called Hughes–Ryan Amendment to the Foreign Assistance Act of 1974, which prohibited the expenditure of appropriated funds by or on behalf of the CIA for intelligence activities "unless and until the President finds that each such operation is important to the national security of the United States and reports, in a timely fashion, a description and scope of such operation to the appropriate committees of Congress" (section 662). This was intended to ensure that clear responsibility for such action was attributable to the President and that Congress was always made aware of such activities. Due to the sensitivity of their content, presidential findings are almost always classified.

The most recent change to exercise of findings occurred in the Intelligence Authorization Act of 1991, which introduced increased flexibility in the reporting requirement: findings are to be "reported to the intelligence committees as soon as possible" after being approved "and before the initiation of the covert action authorized by the finding." As such, presidential findings are one of the primary means through which the intelligence committees exercise their oversight of the government's intelligence operations. However, the Intelligence Authorization Act allows the President to proceed without notifying Congress if he notifies them afterwards "in a timely fashion."

Notes

References

Sources 
 

United States federal law
United States presidential directives